Benjamin ben Immanuel Musaphia (c. 1606 – 1675), also called Benjamin Musaphia or Mussafia and Dionysius, was a Jewish doctor, scholar and kabbalist.

Musaphia was probably born in Spain.  He married Sara Abigail da Silva, daughter of Semuel da Silva, in 1628. Their sons and grandsons joined the court of the Gottorps, and a daughter was married to Gabriel Milan, who would later be appointed governor of the Danish West-Indies (now U.S. Virgin Islands). Around this time, Musaphia graduated from the Padua medical school, which was regarded as the best of its kind at the time.

Publications 
After Sara's death on 7 August 1634, Musaphia dedicated Zekher Rav, an adaptation of the creation myth in which all Hebrew word roots are used exactly once, to her. It was first published in Amsterdam, Netherlands, in 1635, and a second edition with a Latin translation was published in Hamburg in 1638.

Another work was published in 1640, namely Sacro-Medicæ Sententiæ ex Bibliis, a medical treatise containing about 800 sentences on medicine. It contained a section on alchemy that created some stirring at the time. Musaphia also dedicated a work on ebb and flow to Christian IV of Denmark in 1642.

Career 
In 1646, while living in Glückstadt, Holstein, Musaphia was appointed royal physician to the Danish court by Christian IV.

Around 1648, probably in connection with the death of Christian IV, Musaphia went to Amsterdam and joined the college of rabbis. In 1655, he published an extended version of Nathan ben Jehiels Talmudic dictionary Aruk (ca. 1100), titled Musaf he-'Aruk, detailing many Jewish customs. The preface states that he had been collecting this information since a young boy. Musaphia was also working on a revised version of the Talmud, which was nevertheless never published, and the manuscripts have since been lost.

Personal life and family 
In the mid-1660s, Musaphia was caught up in the Sabbateans movement, which proclaimed that Sabbatai Zevi was the new Messiah.

His brother Albert Dionis was one of the wealthiest Jews in Hamburg in 1614.

Musaphia died in 1675, in Amsterdam.

Sources 
 H. C. Terslin, Guvernør over Dansk Vestindien Gabriel Milan og hans Efterkommere (Helsingør, 1926)
 Hauch-Fausbøll, Jødernes Færden og Ophold i den Danske State i 17. Aarh. (Tidsskrift for Jødisk Historie og Literratur II)
 Meyer Kayserling, Jødernes Historie
 J. Margolinsky, Benjamin Musaphia (Tidsskrift for Jødisk Historie og Literratur III)

References

External links 
  Jewish Encyclopedia article
 The medical school of Padua and its Jewish graduates
 Zecher Rav

Danish alchemists
Danish Sephardi Jews
Dutch alchemists
Kabbalists
Jewish Dutch writers
Spanish Jews
Danish people of Spanish descent
Dutch Sephardi Jews
German Sephardi Jews
1675 deaths
Year of birth uncertain
17th-century alchemists